Mbieri (originally known as Mbaeri) is a town in southeastern Nigeria. It is named after one of the indigenous Igbo clans that conquered parts of the old Owerri province. Mbieri is in Mbaitoli council of Imo State and it is the biggest of the original nine towns of Mbaitoli. The region surrounding Mbieri is rich in hydrocarbons.

Town structure and surroundings 
Mbieri town is made up of the following villages: Achi, Amankuta, Amaulu, Awo, Ebom, Eziome, Obazu, Obokwe, Ohohia, Ubakuru, Umuagwu, Umuahii, Umuneke, Umudagu, Umuduru, Umunjam, Umuobom, Umuomumu and Umuonyeali. Currently Mbieri is divided into the following autonomous communities; Amaike-Mbieri, Awo-Mbieri, Ezi-Mbieri, Ihitte isi-Mbieri, Obazu Mbieri, Obi-Mbieri and Umueze-Mbieri. It has boundary with the following communities; Iho, Akabo and Amatta (Ikeduru), Umuoba, Owalla, Orji, Amakohia, Akwakuma (Uratta, Owerri North), Owerri Nchi Ise (Owerri Municipal), Ubomiri, Ifakala, Orodo and Ogwa (Mbaitoli). Works-layout Owerri is in  Umudagu Mbieri

It is about 8 km north of Owerri.

References 

Place name and co-ordinates verified using GEOnet Names Server, National Geospatial-Intelligence Agency.

Towns in Imo State